Francis Lonsdale Morton (21 December 1901 – 14 October 1971) was an Australian cricketer who played first-class cricket from 1922 to 1932.

A fast bowler, Morton made his first-class debut for South Australia in the 1921–22 season. He played a few more games for South Australia before moving to Melbourne during the 1922–23 season. He made his debut for Victoria in 1926–27. In his second match Victoria compiled the world record score of 1107; Morton, batting at number 10, was run out without scoring.

He took 23 wickets at an average of 34.78 in the 1926–27 season, and 28 wickets at 27.96 in 1927–28, when Victoria won the Sheffield Shield and Morton was the leading pace bowler in the competition. He was selected in a 13-man squad to tour New Zealand at the end of the season on the basis of his "sheer pace". He played in four of the six first-class matches on the tour, including one of the two against New Zealand, but he took only seven wickets, and none at all against New Zealand. He was more successful in the minor matches.

In later years his form fell away. He took only one wicket (that of Douglas Jardine) when Victoria played MCC in November 1928. His last four matches were played against Tasmania, as captain, when Victoria fielded weaker teams than its Sheffield Shield side. In his last match, in 1931–32, he took his career-best figures in the second innings, 5 for 40, including a hat-trick.

See also
 List of Victoria first-class cricketers

References

External links
 Frank Morton at Cricinfo
 Frank Morton at CricketArchive

1901 births
1971 deaths
Australian cricketers
Victoria cricketers
Cricketers from Adelaide
South Australia cricketers